Miloš Krstić may refer to:

Miloš Krstić (footballer, born 1987), Serbian association football midfielder
Miloš Krstić (footballer, born 1988), Serbian association football centre-back